Thomas Stanley Monk (20 August 1904 – April 1979) was a British rower. He competed in the men's coxed four event at the 1924 Summer Olympics.

References

External links
 

1904 births
1979 deaths
British male rowers
Olympic rowers of Great Britain
Rowers at the 1924 Summer Olympics
Sportspeople from Chertsey